Afrikanetz makumazan is a moth in the family Cossidae. It is found in Saudi Arabia.

References

Natural History Museum Lepidoptera generic names catalog

Cossinae
Moths described in 2009
Moths of the Middle East